Rąbież  is a village in the administrative district of Gmina Opinogóra Górna, within Ciechanów County, Masovian Voivodeship, in east-central Poland.

History 
From 1975 to 1998, the village belongs to Ciechanów Voivodeship.

Climate 
The climate is moderate, characterized by mild winters and warm summers. The average temperature in January is -1 °C to -5 °C, in July it is +17 °C to +19 °C.  Precipitation is 500-800 mm.

References

Villages in Ciechanów County